Queen Mother Dorji Wangmo (Dzongkha: རྡོ་རྗེ་དབང་མོ་དབང་ཕྱུག་; Wylie: Rdo-rje Dbang-mo Dbang-phyug; born 10 June 1955)  is the Queen Mother (Gyalyum Kude, literally meaning "Queen Mother") of Bhutan, and first wife of former King Jigme Singye Wangchuck, who is married to four sisters all of whom were entitled to be called queen.

Biography 

Her father, Yab Dasho Ugyen Dorji (1925–2019), was the Founder and Proprietor of Ugyen Academy (03/04/2002). Her mother is Yum Thuiji Zam (b. 1932).

Ashi Dorji Wangmo Wangchuck is the first wife of King Jigme Singye Wangchuck, the Fourth King of Bhutan.

She was educated at St. Helen's School, Kurseong, India.

She is the mother of Princess Ashi Sonam Dechen Wangchuck and Prince Dasho Jigyel Ugyen Wangchuck.

Activities
The Queen Mother is not only an accomplished author but also a keen supporter of literary works, particularly among the youth. She has sponsored and edited a number of books on poetry and essays on issues of relevance to the country. She is the author of “Of Rainbows and Clouds” a story of Dasho Yab Ugyen Dorji (the Queen’s Father), which is not only a gripping family saga, but an illuminating window on Bhutanese culture, society and history. Her second book “Treasures of the Thunder Dragon: A Portrait of Bhutan” is a blend of personal memoir, history, folklore and travelogue. Her third book “Dochula: A Spiritual Abode in Bhutan“ is a documentation of the Druk Wangyel Complex consisting of the Lungchutse Lhakhang, 108 Druk Wangyel Stupas, the Druk Wangyel Lhakhang and the Druk Wangyel Tshechu.

She was honoured with the Pope Francis Charity and Leadership Award at a ceremony, in recognition of the work done by Her Majesty’s Tarayana Foundation under her leadership.

Children 
She had, with the former king, the following children:

Selected works 
 Of Rainbows and Clouds: The Life of Yab Ugyen Dorji as told to His Daughter (1998).
 Treasures of the Thunder Dragon: A Portrait of Bhutan (2006).
 Dochula: A Spiritual Abode in Bhutan (2015).

Patronages 
 Chief Patron to Ministry of Agriculture and Forests (MOAF) since 1999.
 Chief Patron of “Bhutan Echoes: Drukyul's Arts & Literature Festival”.
 Honorary President of Sherubtse College since 2000.
 President and Founder of the Tarayana Foundation (TF) since 2003.
 Patron of the Folk Heritage Museum (FHM) [Phelchey Toenkhyim] since 2001.

Honours 

  :
  Caritas in Veritate International: Pope Francis Award for Charity & Leadership (22 October 2016).

References

Notes

1955 births
Living people
Bhutanese monarchy
20th-century women writers
20th-century writers
21st-century women writers
Queen mothers
Wangchuck dynasty